Laila Iskandar may refer to:
 Lili Iskandar (born 2002), footballer from Lebanon
 Laila Iskander, Egyptian minister of the environment